"Turkey Lurkey Time" is a song-and-dance number from Act 1 of Promises, Promises, the Burt Bacharach/Hal David musical, with a book by Neil Simon. It was originally choreographed for the 1968 Broadway production by Michael Bennett. The dance takes place as part of an office Christmas party scene.

The dance 
As conceived by Bennett "with stunning energy and inventiveness", "Turkey Lurkey Time" is a dance performed by three secretaries at an office Christmas party. Their infectious singing and gyrations build into a frenetic chorus dance, as the office staff copy the trio, climaxing with some atop the office desks. According to Neil Simon, "we were having some problems at the end of the first act ... the number [Bennett] came up with didn't just solve the problem, it was a sensation."

Some of the dancers later claimed they had needed regular trips to the chiropractor, so severe was the strain of Bennett's relentless head-bopping choreography. The secretaries of the original cast were Margo Sappington, Baayork Lee and Donna McKechnie.

The number was televised at the 1969 Tony Awards and also performed in the 2003 movie Camp. The song was also featured in a season four episode of the hit Fox show Glee.

Watch

Notes

References 
Long, Robert Emmet (2001). Broadway, the Golden Years: Jerome Robbins and the Great Choreographer-directors: 1940 to the Present, Continuum International Publishing Group, 
Mandelbaum, Ken (1990). 'A Chorus Line' and the Musicals of Michael Bennett. St Martins Press, 
McKechnie, Donna; Lawrence, Greg (2006). Time Steps: My Musical Comedy Life, New York: Simon & Schuster, .

1968 songs
American Christmas songs
Songs from musicals
Songs with music by Burt Bacharach
Songs with lyrics by Hal David